Faulstich is the surname of:
Edith Margaret Faulstich (1907–1972), American philatelist and philatelic journalist
Gerhard Faulstich, German baritone
Marga Faulstich (1915–1998), German glass chemist
Martin Faulstich
 (1837–??)
 (1946–2016)
 (born 1946)
E. W. Faulstich (c.1983), author of History, Harmony, and the Hebrew Kings

German-language surnames
Surnames from nicknames